The Feldberg is a mountain, in the Kaiser range in the Austrian state of Tyrol.

Its summit may be ascended on an easy mountain path either directly from Griesenau or via the  Stripsenjochhaus hut and the Stripsenkopf.

External links 
Entry about the mountain tour

One-thousanders of Austria
Mountains of the Alps
Mountains of Tyrol (state)
Kaiser Mountains